Cheng Kwok Wing was a male international table tennis player from Hong Kong.

Table tennis career
He won a bronze medal at the 1952 World Table Tennis Championships in the Swaythling Cup (men's team event) when representing Hong Kong. The team consisted of Chung Chin Sing, Keung Wing Ning, Fu Chi Fong and Suh Sui Cho.

See also
 List of table tennis players
 List of World Table Tennis Championships medalists

References

Hong Kong male table tennis players
World Table Tennis Championships medalists
Date of birth missing
Possibly living people